Maksimilijan Vrhovac (23 November 1752 in Karlovac – 16 December 1827 in Zagreb) was the bishop of Zagreb. He was one of the ideological architects of the Croatian national revival, and is notable for founding the Maksimir Park in 1787, one of the first major public parks in Southeast Europe. Vrhovac was a member of the Freemasons.

Family 
His father, Aleksa, was captain of the frontier-guards near the Austrian-Ottoman border. For his merit, he was awarded with nobility by the Austrian empress Maria Theresia.

Education 
After he graduated school in Graz, Vrhovac joined the army, but soon left when he realized that he did not qualify for this occupation. Instead, he joined the seminary in Zagreb.

Vrhovac studied in Vienna and Bologna, and became a vice-rector, and later rector, at the seminary in Zagreb, as well as a professor of dogma at the Academy in Zagreb. Emperor Joseph II promoted him to rector of the seminary in Pest before he returned to Croatia as a bishop.

Promoter of "Illyrian" language 
In 1808, Vrhovac requested the Croatian Parliament to open his library to the public. In the 1810s, he worked on translating the Bible into the Kajkavian Croatian language. Other contributors in the program were Antun Vranić, Ivan Nepomuk Labaš, Ivan Gusić, Ivan Birling, Stjepan Korolija, and Tomaš Mikloušić. In 1810, he visited Vienna. During his stay, Jernej Kopitar requested that Vrhovac organize a collection of local songs, but this attempt was not successful.

To promote the Ilyrian language, Vrhovac established a printing house and printed books on the Kajkavian and Štokavian dialects. 

Vrhovac continued to pursue his own perception of the language and people. After Napoleon captured the territory of Austria-Hungary, he issued a proclamation in 1813 to "natives across Sava", emphasizing that there were no more borders between Croats in Croatia, Dalmatia, and the Coastal region. After the defeat of Napoleon in Russia and the return of Austria-Hungary to its borders from 1806, the court in Vienna resented Vrhovac for his earlier behavior. Vrhovac was a distinguished opponent of the expansion of Hungarian influence to South Slavs.

In 1814, Vrhovac's cannon Mahanović, following the instructions of Vrhovac, published a work titled Observationes circa croaticam ortho-graphiam without taking in consideration the position regarding čakavian being only a dialect of Croatian as presented by Jernej Kopitar. Nevertheless, Mahanović did somewhat follow the idea of Kopitar to develop a unified orthography for all South Slavic languages.

Footnotes

References
 Franjo Šanjek: "Kršćanstvo na hrvatskom prostoru" (Zagreb, Kršćanska sadašnjost, 1996, str. 406.)
 
 
 
 
 
 
 
 

1752 births
1827 deaths
Roman Catholic bishops in the Austrian Empire
People from Karlovac
Bishops of Zagreb